Wesselburen is a small town in the district of Dithmarschen in the German Federal State of Schleswig-Holstein.

Wesselburen is part of the Amt ("collective municipality") Büsum-Wesselburen.

Notable residents
Christian Friedrich Hebbel, 1813–1863, poet and dramatist
Christian Otto Mohr, 1835–1918, civil engineer
Adolf Bartels, 1862–1945, journalist, poet, and also literary historian
Jil Sander (born 1943), fashion designer
Jürgen Koppelin (born 1945), politician (FDP)
Kirsten Fehrs (born 1961), bishop
Max Pauly (1907-1946), SS concentration camp commander and war criminal

References

Dithmarschen